Procons Oy Ab is a Finnish company specialized in sheet metal roll forming and subcontracting. Main business areas include sliding door profiles, bike mudguards and stays, profiles for the electrical and mining industries as well as sheet metal products. The company was founded in 1934 and is located in Malax, Finland.

History 

The company that would become Procons Oy Ab was Waasan Vanne, founded in 1934 in Vikby, Finland. It developed and manufactured bicycle mudguards, luggage carriers and rims. In the 1990s, the company shifted its focus to the production of metal profiled products and built automated profiling production lines for thin sheet metal. In 2002, Leif Sandqvist, a former regional executive at Bosch, bought Waasan Vanne. He relocated the company to nearby Malax, his hometown, the next year and, in 2011, reincorporated it as Procons Oy Ab.

Products

Bicycle parts 

Procons is one of Europe's largest manufacturers of bicycle fenders and stays with a production of about 750,000 fenders per year. The product range consists of various models and brands that are produced mainly from 0.5 mm sheet metal in a fully automated line.

Other 

The company acts as a subcontractor providing roll-form manufacturing of various profiles for heavy industry clients. It also develops and manufactures components for the assembly of sliding doors. Other business areas include eccentric pressing, welding, and assembly.

References

External links 
 

1934 establishments in Finland
Metal companies of Finland